The 2021 FIG World Cup circuit in Rhythmic Gymnastics is a series of competitions officially organized and promoted by the International Gymnastics Federation. The events had originally been scheduled to be held in 2020, but were postponed to 2021 due to the COVID-19 pandemic.

With stopovers in Europe and Asia, the World Cup competitions are scheduled for March 26–28 in Sofia (BUL), April 16–18 in Tashkent (UZB), May 7–9 in Baku (AZE), May 28–30 in Pesaro (ITA). World Challenge Cup competitions are scheduled for July 2–4 in Minsk (BLR), July 9–11 in Moscow (RUS), October 15–17 in Cluj Napoca (ROU). Originally, the Cluj Napoca stage was scheduled to be held June, but it was postponed to October, and the World Challenge Cup stage in Portimão, Portugal, was eventually cancelled.

This year's World Cup series also served as qualifications for the 2020 Summer Olympics, with the top 3 ranked gymnasts (max. 1 per NOC), not already qualified at the 2019 Rhythmic Gymnastics World Championships, achieving a quota for their NOC at the individual all-around event.

Formats

Medal winners

All-around

Individual

Group

Apparatus

Hoop

Ball

Clubs

Ribbon

5 balls

4 clubs and 3 hoops

Overall medal table

See also
 Gymnastics at the 2020 Summer Olympics
 2021 FIG Artistic Gymnastics World Cup series
 2021 Rhythmic Gymnastics World Championships

References

Rhythmic Gymnastics World Cup
Rhythmic Gymnastics World Cup